Aserca Airlines C.A. (legally Aero Servicios Carabobo C.A.) was an airline based in Valencia, Venezuela. It operated domestic and regional scheduled services to destinations in the Caribbean and Central America. Its main hub was at Arturo Michelena International Airport.

History

The airline was established on March 6, 1968, as a private air transport company. Subsequently, on July 27, 1990, the Valencian businessman Simeón García, acquired all the shares and decided to direct it to passenger air transport. The airline started operations on September 4, 1992, with small aircraft for private transport. In 1992 it entered the domestic scheduled market with a leased Douglas DC-9-30. Aserca's operations were centred on Valencia, but it managed to develop Caracas as a hub after 1994 which, combined with the demise of flag carrier Viasa in 1997, made Aserca experience a significant growth in its market share, expanding its network to Bogotá, Lima and Miami, via Aruba. Between 1998 and 2000 Aserca had a controlling interest in Air Aruba, forming an alliance between both airlines.

In September 2008, the airline created a commercial alliance with SBA Airlines, also from Venezuela with whom it undertook international expansion through, unifying the corporate image of both airlines and coordinating their respective itineraries to improve their connection times between the flights of both airlines, to facilitate connections between the national destinations of Aserca with international destinations of SBA. The alliance, namedGrupo Cóndor C.A., also collaborated with the Dominican airline PAWA Dominicana.

In June 2013, Venezuela's National Institute of Civil Aviation (INAC) announced that it will prohibit operations of classic aircraft types like the Douglas DC-9, Boeing 727 and Boeing 737-200 in Venezuela from November 1, 2013. Aserca Airlines could obtain a special dispensation from INAC allowing the airline to operate its remaining two DC-9s until July 1, 2014, when it chose to replace them with the McDonnell Douglas MD-80.

On February 21, 2018, it was announced that INAC had withdrawn the airline's operating license until further notice. The country's newspapers blame the lack of proof of insurance for the aircraft in the fleet. Aserca Airlines planned to restart operations. But on May 22, 2018, Aserca announced it had ceased all operations due to financial bankruptcy after returned its air operator's certificate.

Destinations
 
Aserca Airlines served the following destination at the time of its demise:

Codeshare agreements
Aserca Airlines additionally had codeshare agreements with:

PAWA Dominicana (on routes to Antigua, Havana, Miami, Port-au-Prince, San Juan and St. Maarten)
SBA Airlines

Fleet

Final fleet
 

The Aserca Airlines fleet consisted of the following aircraft (as of February 2018):

Former fleet
Over the years, Aserca Airlines has operated the following aircraft types:

Accidents and incidents
On February 12, 2008, a Douglas DC-9-31 (registered YV298T) crashed on one of the runways of the Simón Bolívar International Airport, the aircraft left the hangar with its engines running and could not brake or turn, it crossed runway 09 when it fell into a channel in the area before reaching runway 10L.

On March 6, 2012, a McDonnell Douglas MD-82 (registered YV348T) struck against five cows that were on the runway during landing at Mayor Buenaventura Vivas Airport, generating minor damage to the jet on the left main gear and left hand flaps. All 125 passengers and 6 crew were uninjured and the aircraft was repaired.

On August 24, 2012, a McDonnell Douglas MD-82 (registered YV493T) ran off the runway on landing at Mayor Buenaventura Vivas Airport during heavy storms, sustaining minor damage. No injuries were reported. The aircraft was however withdrawn from service.

See also
List of defunct airlines of Venezuela
PAWA Dominicana
SBA Airlines

References

External links

Official website 

Defunct airlines of Venezuela
Airlines established in 1968
Airlines disestablished in 2018
2018 disestablishments in Venezuela
Venezuelan companies established in 1968